Eumetula bouvieri is a species of sea snail, a gastropod in the family Newtoniellidae, which is known from European waters. It was described by Dautzenberg and Fischer H., in 1896.

References

External links
  Serge GOFAS, Ángel A. LUQUE, Joan Daniel OLIVER,José TEMPLADO & Alberto SERRA (2021) - The Mollusca of Galicia Bank (NE Atlantic Ocean); European Journal of Taxonomy 785: 1–114

Newtoniellidae
Gastropods described in 1896